This is a list of musicians who play Celtic metal, a form of folk metal that combines Celtic rock with various styles of heavy metal music.

References 

Celtic metal musicians
Celtic metal musical groups
Lists of musicians by genre